Visitors to Malawi must obtain a visa from one of the Malawian diplomatic missions unless they come from one of the visa exempt countries or countries eligible for visa on arrival.

Visa policy map

Visa exemption 

Citizens of the following 33 countries and territories can visit Malawi for up to 90 days without a visa:

Holders of diplomatic, service or official passports of any country traveling on duty do not require a visa for 90 days.

And Laissez-Passer holders of United Nations, African Union, African Development Bank, International Red Locust Control Organization for Central and Southern Africa and Preferential Trade Area.

Holders of confirmed onward tickets for a maximum transit time of 24 hours can transit without a visa through Malawi. This facility is not applicable to nationals of Egypt, Iraq, Kazakhstan, Russia, Sudan, Syria, Ukraine, Uzbekistan and Yemen.

Visa on arrival
Nationals of certain countries may obtain a visa on arrival to Malawi. The information on which countries are eligible is inconsistent. Depending on the purpose of visit, a traveler who has a valid visa is granted a Visitors Permit (VP) or Business Visit (BV) at the port of entry valid for 30 days and can be extended up to a maximum period of 90 days.

According to a document published by the Department of Immigration, nationals of all countries that are not visa exempt may obtain a visa on arrival. This is not applicable to nationals of the following 52 countries:

eVisa

Malawi launched an eVisa application system on 1 November 2019.

See also

Visa requirements for Malawian citizens

References

External links
List of nationalities who require a visa
List of nationalities who are visa exempt
eVisa portal

Malawi
Foreign relations of Malawi